Sylvia de Neymet Urbina (aka Silvia de Neymet de Christ, 1939 – 13 January 2003) was a Mexican mathematician, the first woman to earn a doctorate in mathematics in Mexico, and the first female professor in the faculty of sciences of the National Autonomous University of Mexico (UNAM).

Early life and education
De Neymet was born in Mexico City in 1939. Her mother had been orphaned in the Mexican Revolution of 1910, studied art at La Esmeralda, and became a teacher; she encouraged De Neymet in her studies. Her father's mother was also a teacher, and her father was a civil engineer.

After two years of mathematical study in Paris, at the Institut Henri Poincaré, from 1959 to 1961, de Neymet returned to Mexico and was given a degree in mathematics in 1961, with a thesis on differential equations supervised by Solomon Lefschetz, who by this time was regularly wintering at UNAM. At around the same time, CINVESTAV (the Center for Research and Advanced Studies of the National Polytechnic Institute) was founded; de Neymet became one of the first students there, and the first doctoral student of Samuel Gitler Hammer, one of the founders of CINVESTAV. She married Michael Christ, a French physician, in 1962, and while still finishing her doctorate became a teacher at the Escuela Superior de Física y Matemáticas of the Instituto Politécnico Nacional, founded four years earlier. She completed her doctorate under Gitler's supervision in 1966, becoming one of the first seven people to earn a mathematics doctorate in Mexico, and the first Mexican woman to do so.

Career and later life
After completing her doctorate, she joined the faculty of sciences of UNAM, one of only three full-time mathematicians there (with Víctor Neumann-Lara and Arturo Fregoso Urbina). After continuing her career at UNAM for many years, she died on 13 January 2003.

Her book Introducción a los grupos topológicos de transformaciones [Introduction to topological transformation groups] was published posthumously in 2005.

References

Mexican mathematicians
Mexican women mathematicians
Academic staff of the National Autonomous University of Mexico
1939 births
2003 deaths